The Colorado checkered whiptail or triploid checkered whiptail (Aspidoscelis neotesselatus) is a species of teiid lizard found in Colorado in the United States.

References

Aspidoscelis
Reptiles described in 1997
Taxa named by James M. Walker
Taxa named by James E. Cordes
Taxa named by Harry L. Taylor
Reptiles of the United States
Taxobox binomials not recognized by IUCN